Andrew White (21 March 1894 – 3 August 1968) was a New Zealand rugby union player. He played 34 matches for the All Blacks—three as captain—including four internationals. In all he scored 48 points for the national side.

White died in Christchurch on 3 August 1968, and was buried at Waimairi Cemetery.

References

1894 births
1968 deaths
Rugby union players from Invercargill
People educated at Southland Boys' High School
New Zealand rugby union players
New Zealand international rugby union players
Southland rugby union players
Canterbury rugby union players
Rugby union flankers
Burials at Waimairi Cemetery